Hor Nambora (or Nam Bora, born 27 July 1957) is the ambassador of Cambodia to the United Kingdom, Ireland, the Nordic countries and Ethiopia . His father is Cambodian diplomat and politician Hor Namhong.

Living as an exile in Paris, Nambora was studying physics and mathematics but earned no any degree. Believing they represented a fresh hope for the war-torn country, Nambora returned to Cambodia where he was immediately interned in a labour camp where his father Hor Namhong served as a chief of Being Trabek Prison. He worked as a researcher at the Tuol Sleng Genocide Museum from 1980 to 1985 and as director of the Humanitarian Relief Committee in Kompong Som Port from 1986 to 1987. In 1988 he joined the Foreign Ministry and within a few years was appointed to posts in Thailand and then with the United Nations in Geneva.

In 1996 Nambora returned to Cambodia to enter politics, accepting the titles of Under-secretary of State and Foreign Affairs Adviser from prime minister Hun Sen. In 1999 he, with help of his father Hor Namhong, returned to diplomacy when he was appointed ambassador to Australia and New Zealand. Nambora used his position there to improve ties between ASEAN leaders and those countries. In 2004 he was transferred to London when he was appointed ambassador to the United Kingdom, Denmark, Finland, Ireland, Norway and Sweden. He became the first Cambodian ambassador to the United Kingdom since the embassy was abandoned in 1975. In 2011 the ambassadorship to Ethiopia was added to his responsibilities.

Awards and honours
In 2002 he was awarded the 'Citizen of Humanity' award by Australia's National Committee on Human Rights Education.

In 2007 he became a Commander of the Royal Order of Cambodia and in 2010 a Grand Officer of the same order.

References

Living people
1957 births
Ambassadors of Cambodia to Australia
Ambassadors of Cambodia to Denmark
Ambassadors of Cambodia to Ethiopia
Ambassadors of Cambodia to Finland
Ambassadors of Cambodia to Ireland
Ambassadors of Cambodia to New Zealand
Ambassadors of Cambodia to Norway
Ambassadors of Cambodia to Sweden
Ambassadors of Cambodia to the United Kingdom